Charles Thomas Abraham (1857–1945) was the second Bishop of Derby (then a suffragan bishop in the Diocese of Southwell) from 1909 until 1927.

Life

Abraham was born in 1857. He was the son of Charles John Abraham and his wife Caroline Abraham. He was educated at Keble College, Oxford. Ordained in  1881, he began his career with a curacy at  St Mary's Church, Shrewsbury and was subsequently Vicar of All Saints, Shrewsbury and Christ Church, Lichfield before succeeding Edward Were as the Bishop of Derby (suffragan). His father, Charles, and his son, Philip,  were also bishops; another son, Geoffrey, was killed in action during the First World War. After he retired, a cousin bequeathed Little Moreton Hall in Congleton to him. He died on 27 January 1945.

References

External links

1857 births
Alumni of Keble College, Oxford
20th-century Church of England bishops
Bishops suffragan of Derby
1945 deaths